Homer Floyd (born May 16, 1936) is a former Canadian football player who played for the Edmonton Eskimos. He played college football at the University of Kansas.

References

1936 births
Living people
Players of American football from Alabama
American football halfbacks
Canadian football running backs
American players of Canadian football
Kansas Jayhawks football players
Edmonton Elks players
People from Wetumpka, Alabama